A hand deformity is a disorder of the hand that can be congenital or acquired.An example is Madelung's deformity.

References

External links 

Congenital disorders of musculoskeletal system